Angatra is a genus of beetles in the family Buprestidae, containing the following species:

 Angatra magna Descarpentries, 1969
 Angatra parva Descarpentries, 1969

References

Buprestidae genera